Dipterina imbriferana is a species of moth in the family Tortricidae first described by Edward Meyrick in 1881.  This species is endemic to New Zealand.

References

Schoenotenini
Moths described in 1881
Moths of New Zealand
Endemic fauna of New Zealand
Taxa named by Edward Meyrick
Endemic moths of New Zealand